The Very Best of Despina Vandi is a compilation album by Greek singer Despina Vandi, released in 2005 by record label EMI in Turkey.

Track listing

Release history

Credits and personnel

Personnel
Natalia Germanou - lyrics
Pantelis Kanarakis - lyrics
Tony Kontaxakis - music, lyrics
Lambis Livieratos - lyrics
Giannis Parios - lyrics
Giorgos Pavrianos - lyrics
Phoebus - music, lyrics
Despina Vandi - vocals

Production
Ayhan Ergönül & Michael - compilation

Design
Şeref İnce - background photography

Credits adapted from the album's liner notes.

References

External links
 Official site

2005 greatest hits albums
Despina Vandi compilation albums
Albums produced by Phoebus (songwriter)
Greek-language compilation albums
Minos EMI compilation albums